is a Japanese wrestler. He competed in the 1996 Summer Olympics, where he finished in ninth place in the 57kg freestyle class.

Abe competed collegiately for Penn State, where he was a four-time NCAA All-American and one of only two NCAA Division I to garner All-American honors by finishing 4th, 3rd, 2nd and 1st, respectively, at consecutive NCAA Tournaments.

See also
List of Pennsylvania State University Olympians

References

External links

1970 births
Living people
Wrestlers at the 1996 Summer Olympics
Japanese male sport wrestlers
Olympic wrestlers of Japan
Sportspeople from Tokyo
Penn State Nittany Lions wrestlers
20th-century Japanese people
21st-century Japanese people
Asian Wrestling Championships medalists